The men's individual compound competition at the 2009 World Archery Championships took place on 2–9 September 2009 in Ulsan, South Korea. 113 archers entered the competition, with one withdrawal before the qualification round on 2 September. As there were fewer than 128 entrants, all archers qualified for the 7-round knockout round on 5 September which was drawn according to their qualification round scores. The semi-finals and finals then took place on 9 September.

First seed Reo Wilde beat Liam Grimwood in the final by two points.

Seeds
The top 16 qualifiers received byes to the second round.

Draw

Finals

References

2009 World Archery Championships